The Changshou Yangtze River Railway Bridge  is a railway truss bridge over the Yangtze River in Changshou District, Chongqing, China. The bridge was completed in 2005 and carries two track of the Chongqing–Huaihua Railway. The bridge won the 2008 Lu Ban award for excellence in engineering.

See also
Yangtze River bridges and tunnels

References

2005 establishments in China
Bridges completed in 2005
Bridges in Chongqing
Bridges over the Yangtze River
Truss bridges in China
Railway bridges in China